The historic Donnelly House, an example of Neo-classical architecture, was built in 1905 as the residence of James W. Donnelly. Mr. Donnelly was an industrialist, manufacturer, real-estate developer, philanthropist, and civic leader.

While the Donnelly House has served primarily as a private residence, it was also the home of the Birmingham Civic Ballet during the 1950s. Ultimately, the home was opened as a venue for weddings, business meetings and other activities.

The house was purchased by Carl Schoettlin in 2011.  The house was fully renovated by Schoettlin Building Company.  Currently the house is an entertainment venue specializing in weddings, receptions, parties, etc.  The house is managed by Carl Schoettlin.

The home was listed on the Alabama Register of Landmarks and Heritage on May 20, 1975.  It is also a contributing property to the Highland Avenue Historic District, a historic district on the National Register of Historic Places.

See also
National Register of Historic Places listings in Jefferson County, Alabama

References

External links
 Historic Donnelly House (Official website)

Houses in Birmingham, Alabama
Properties on the Alabama Register of Landmarks and Heritage
Neoclassical architecture in Alabama